Phillip Island Road is a tourist highway in Victoria, Australia and branches off the Bass Highway at the township of Anderson. Previously assigned State Route 186, it was later designated B420. It was named due to the Phillip Island Bridge which opened in San Remo on the 21 November 1969.

Major intersections

|}

See also

 Highways in Australia
 Highways in Victoria

References

Highways in Victoria (Australia)
Phillip Island